Héctor Aizpuro (born 10 October 1940) is a Mexican basketball player. He competed in the men's tournament at the 1960 Summer Olympics.

References

External links

1940 births
Living people
Mexican men's basketball players
1959 FIBA World Championship players
Olympic basketball players of Mexico
Basketball players at the 1960 Summer Olympics
Basketball players from Nuevo León
Sportspeople from Monterrey